Tomasz Stolpa  (born 18 March 1983 in Sosnowiec) is a Polish footballer.

Career

Zagłębie Sosnowiec
Tomasz Stolpa began his career playing from youth level as a striker for Zagłębie Sosnowiec, a football club in Sosnowiec, Poland, making his first appearance for them in June 2001. He was the top-scorer for this club with 25 goals over 70 appearances and helped them to win promotion twice.

Tromsø IL
Tomasz's appearances with Zagłębie Sosnowiec attracted the attention of the Norwegian Premier League club Tromsø IL and he was subsequently signed to play for them in Norway. After a short while on loan to the Belgian club V.C. Eendracht Aalst 2002, Tomasz returned to Tromsø, participated in the Royal League, a football tournament between top clubs in Norway, Sweden and Denmark, and played with Tromsø IL in the UEFA Cup.

Enköpings SK
In January 2006, he was signed to play for Enköpings SK in Sweden and helped them towards promotion to the second-highest football league in Sweden, the Superettan, by scoring 4 goals in 14 games.

Gefle IF
In December 2006, he signed a two-year contract with the club Gefle IF, who play in the top football league in Sweden, the Allsvenskan.

Grindavík
In 2008 Tomasz Stolpa left Gefle IF over selection concerns and joined the Icelandic club Grindavík. His performances attracted the attention of some Greek and Cypriot clubs, but the manager of Grindavík would not sanction his transfer. Tomasz scored 5 goals in 22 games in his first season for Grindavík, playing often, not in his normal position as striker but on the left wing, due to his ability with his left foot.

FK Qäbälä
In January 2009, after receiving a good offer, he signed a one-year contract with the club FK Qäbälä, who play in the Azerbaijan Premier League. During Gabala's 2-1 victory over Standard Sumgayit on 20 November 2009, Stolpa scored Gabala's 200th goal.

Zagłębie Sosnowiec
In September 2010, he joined Zagłębie Sosnowiec on a half year contract.

Odra Wodzisław
In February 2011, he moved to Odra Wodzisław.

Career statistics

Achievements
 Club promotion twice and top-goalscorer with Zagłębie Sosnowiec
 Fourth place in the UEFA Cup with Tromsø IL
 Club promotion with Enköpings SK

References

External links
 
 Goal statistics in Iceland
 

Polish footballers
Tromsø IL players
Zagłębie Sosnowiec players
Odra Wodzisław Śląski players
Gefle IF players
Gabala FC players
Polish expatriate footballers
Expatriate footballers in Norway
Expatriate footballers in Belgium
Expatriate footballers in Sweden
Expatriate footballers in Iceland
Expatriate footballers in Azerbaijan
I liga players
II liga players
III liga players
Eliteserien players
Challenger Pro League players
Allsvenskan players
Ettan Fotboll players
Úrvalsdeild karla (football) players
Azerbaijan Premier League players
1983 births
Living people
People from Sosnowiec
Sportspeople from Silesian Voivodeship
Association football forwards
Grindavík men's football players
Polish expatriate sportspeople in Azerbaijan